Barbara DeGenevieve (1947–2014) was an American interdisciplinary artist who worked in photography, video,  and performance. She lectured widely on her work and on subjects including human sexuality, gender, transsexuality, censorship, ethics, and pornography. Her writing on these subjects have been published in art, photographic, and scholarly journals, and her work has been exhibited internationally.

Early life 
DeGenevieve studied photography at the University of New Mexico receiving her MFA in 1980, and began teaching at the University of Illinois at Urbana-Champaign immediately following. She taught at San Jose State University, the San Francisco Art Institute, and the California College of Art before joining the faculty at the School of the Art Institute of Chicago in 1994. DeGenevieve was a professor and chair of the Department of Photography at the School of the Art Institute.

Career 
Much of DeGenevieve's art explored the connections among dominance, power, and sex, including their inverse relationships. This led DeGenevieve into controversy, particularly during the National Endowment for the Arts funding scandals of the early 1990s (widely known as "the culture wars") when she,  Andres Serrano, and Merry Alpern were stripped of their grants from the NEA in 1994. She spoke on many occasions on issues of censorship as a direct result. On some occasions she used performative texts or poems, gothic costume, and theatrical tactics to amplify her point. She might speak in character as parody or as the subject of her discourse, but always with a sense of humor and charity for her subject.

She continued to court controversy, having established an interdisciplinary and new media arts program at SAIC that instructs students on constructing sexually graphic artworks. She spoke at conferences about her students' work, some of which existed in legal gray areas. In 2010 at the College Art Association she noted:"Artists like myself and these students who do work that straddles some dangerous lines, such as the possibility of having the work considered obscene and therefore illegal, need to realize that the idea of free speech does not extend to sexual images. Although anathema to any artist, there is a self-monitoring (if not a self-censorship) that now occurs, and must occur to some extent in order for artists to protect themselves from the vagaries of the “fuzzy logic” employed in the interpretation of lens-derived imagery that is sexual in nature." DeGenevieve's works "showed everyone the rowdy, the provocative. How art should get in your face, really startle you. You should gasp." DeGenevieve photographed five homeless black men from Chicago nude in a hotel room, which received wide recognition for her voices given to the social issues on race, gender and class.

DeGenevieve won awards from the National Endowment for the Arts (Visual Artist Fellowship); Art Matters Foundation Fellowship; and the Illinois Arts Council. Her critical and artistic works have been published in Exposure, SF Camerawork Magazine, and P-Form. Ezell Gallery, Chicago, represents her photographic work.

Selected exhibitions
Barbara DeGenevieve: Medusa's Cave. Iceberg Projects, Chicago (12 September - 10 October 2015)
INTI Terry Adkins, Barbara DeGenevieve, Rochelle Feinstein, Maren Hassinger, Clifford Owens, William Pope.L, Martha Rosler. OnStellarRays, NY (26 June - 29 July 2011) Group Exhibit.
Kissy-Kissy. Dean Jensen Gallery, Milwaukee, WI (15 September – 13 October 2007) Works exhibited: From The Panhandlers Project (2004 – 2006)
Objectifying the Abject: Exploitation, Political (In)Correctness and Ethical Dilemmas. Gallery 400 at University of Illinois at Chicago (7 – 25 February 2006) Work exhibited: Dee, 2005, Gordon, 2004, Hank, 2004, Leon, 2004, Mike, 2005, The Panhandler Project, 2005
I Smell Sex. Visual AIDS, NY curated by Barbara DeGenevieve (October 2001)
Face Forward Self Portraiture in Contemporary Art. John Michael Kohler Arts Center (28 May  – 27 August 1995) Work exhibited: ASK ME ANYTHING, I HAVE NOTHING TO HIDE (1995)
Barbara DeGenevieve: My Words in Your Mouth. Ezell/Gallery 954, Chicago (3–31 March 1995)

Selected works
 The Boys in Albuquerque (1978-1979)
 True Life Novelettes (1979-1982)
 Large Scale (1981-1985)
 Cliche Verres (1985-1992)
 Large Scale Stretched Fabric & Macaroni (1991-1995)
 Porn Poetry (1996-1997)
 Steven X and Barbara C (1999-2000)
 The Panhandler Project (2004-2006)
 Desperado (2004-2006)

Selected essays

Notes

External links

1947 births
2014 deaths
University of New Mexico alumni
Interdisciplinary artists
School of the Art Institute of Chicago faculty
20th-century American artists
21st-century American artists
20th-century American women artists
21st-century American women artists
University of Illinois Urbana-Champaign faculty
San Jose State University faculty
San Francisco Art Institute faculty
California College of the Arts faculty
National Endowment for the Arts Fellows
American women academics